Violet Kemble-Cooper (12 December 1886 – 17 August 1961) was an English-American stage and film actress who appeared on stage and in Hollywood film.

Early life
Born in London, she was a descendant from a well-known theatrical family, the Kemble family. Her father was actor Frank Kemble-Cooper. Her sisters Lillian and Greta and her brother Anthony were actors as well. Her uncle was thespian H. Cooper Cliffe.

Career
She made her first stage appearance in 1905 in her native England in a production of Charley's Aunt. By 1912 she was in America, touring and in stock plays with actors including Blanche Bates and Laurette Taylor. She appeared with John and Ethel Barrymore in Claire de Lune on Broadway in 1921.

Film
As Violet spent her formative years acting in the theater she never appeared in the genre silent films. She appeared in talkies beginning with the Constance Bennett film Our Betters (1933). She appeared in several more films, including the evil spinster Miss Murdstone in the Dickens film adaption David Copperfield (1935) and Boris Karloff's mother in the horror film The Invisible Ray (1936). Kemble-Coopers last movie was the MGM costumer Romeo and Juliet (1936), where she portrayed Lady Capulet.

Personal life and death
She died of a stroke and Parkinson's disease in California in 1961, aged 74.

Filmography

References

External links

1886 births
1961 deaths
Actresses from London
English film actresses
English stage actresses
Kemble family
20th-century English actresses
British expatriate actresses in the United States